Hans Beimler is the name of:

 Hans Beimler (politician) (1895–1936), German Communist Party deputy who fought in the Spanish Civil War
 Hans Beimler (screenwriter) (born 1953), writer for the TV series Star Trek

See also
 LEW Hennigsdorf, formerly VEB Lokomotivbau-Elektrotechnische Werke "Hans Beimler", a rail vehicle factory in Hennigsdorf, Germany